The 1925 Western Kentucky State Normal football team representedWestern Kentucky State Normal School and Teachers College (now known as Western Kentucky University) as an independent during the 1925 college football season. They were coached by Edgar Diddle in his fourth year.

Schedule

References

Western Kentucky State Normal
Western Kentucky Hilltoppers football seasons
Western Kentucky State Normal football